RPM Nautical Foundation is a non-profit archaeological research and educational organization dedicated to the advancement of maritime archaeology that includes littoral surveys and excavation of individual shipwreck and harbor sites.

RPM Nautical Foundation (RPMNF) is organized to operate exclusively for charitable, scientific, literary and educational purposes, all within the meaning of sections 170(c)(2) and 501(c)(3) of the United States Internal Revenue Code. The operating purpose of the company is to engage in the detection, identification, study and preservation of nautical archaeological and historic sites for scientific research, public education, and the advancement of technology. The organization also provides fieldwork and training experience in the field to students as well as the personnel and staff of various government, cultural and educational institutions.

Among the goals for RPMNF is the effort to assist Mediterranean countries with the location, identification, assessment, and research of their submerged cultural material so that these important cultural resources can be protected for future generations.  Accordingly, RPMNF projects are carried out in conjunction with host governments in the Mediterranean and serve as a crucial component in the effort to protect submerged archaeological sites and maritime heritage in association with UNESCO's efforts to preserve world heritage sites. RPMNF policy stipulates that all artifacts are under the jurisdiction of the host government at all times. The location and assessment of wreck sites, as well as site and artifact analysis is beneficial to the many governments that RPMNF works with, as it provides cultural authorities pertinent information for protecting archaeological resources like living things.

Over the past decade RPMNF has made advances in maritime archaeology of the littoral region of the Mediterranean through intensive and systematic use of technology. RPMNF's research vessel, the R/V Hercules, is a purpose-built maritime archaeological platform that has seafloor mapping and three-dimensional modeling capabilities for identification of submerged cultural material sites. The vessel is designed as a self-sufficient base for a wide range of project functions in moderately deep littoral waters, typically limited to 500 m.  These operations include remote sensing equipment that includes autonomous underwater vehicles (AUVs) and various multibeam systems, the deployment of ROVs, data and media processing and other research functions.  Hercules is equipped with a dynamic positioning system and advanced data processing capabilities, as well as adequate deck space and lifting systems to transport and deploy survey equipment.  Potential sites are verified and documented with ROV investigation.  The ROV is employed for video and image documentation, sampling, artifact retrieval, and limited excavation of sites. The ROV is also employed for the excavation of deep-water sites; an excavation methodological process that RPMNF is helping to advance within the field of maritime archaeology.

RPMNF research vessel R/V Hercules is Maltese flagged and based in Valletta, Malta during the winter months.  This research vessel can be deployed throughout the Mediterranean on a project basis.

History

The foundation was established in 2001 by its president, George Robb, who was a director for the Institute of Nautical Archaeology.  As part of RPMNF's initial foundation, it was established as a supporting institute for the Institute of Nautical Archaeology  Early field work centered in Florida and select supporting projects in the Mediterranean.  In 2003, Dr. Jeff Royal became archaeological director, and took over as executive director in 2011, during which time RPMNF's focus has centered on the Mediterranean.  At the end of 2010, RPMNF entered into an agreement and is a supporting institute for the Program in Maritime Studies at East Carolina University.  RPMNF continues to grow its associations with Universities, individual scholars, students, and new countries around the Mediterranean.

Institutional partners
 Albanian Institute of Archaeology
 Croatian Ministry of Culture
 East Carolina University Maritime Studies
 Institute of Nautical Archaeology
 Malta Ministry of Culture and Tourism
 Montenegro Ministry of Culture
 Moroccan Ministry of Culture
 Superintendent of Archaeology, Calabria
 Superintendent of Underwater Archaeology, Sicily
 Tunisian Ministry of Culture

Project History

RPMNF's cooperative projects have proved successful in the identification, mapping, and recording of shipwreck sites and harbor works from the ancient through modern eras.  To date, project areas include Spain, Albania, Montenegro, Croatia, Malta, Morocco, Cyprus, Sicily, Amalfi and Calabria in Italy, Tunisia, and Turkey.  As all archaeological work is performed in conjunction with the host country's cultural authority, one of the crucial outcomes is that the projects assist in both scholarly research and educational projects.  All recovered artifacts remain under the jurisdiction of the host government for educational/research purposes and eventual museum display in each country.  The location and assessment data of wreck sites has proved beneficial to the many governments with which RPMNF have worked as it provides their cultural authorities pertinent information for protecting their submerged archaeological resources. Bathymetric data is also made available to host country hydrographic departments in order to supplement their oceanographic mapping programs.

See also
Archaeology of shipwrecks
Underwater archaeology
Nautical Archaeology Society
Sea Research Society (Shipwrecks & Underwater Archaeology)
Underwater acoustics
Underwater Archaeology Centre
Underwater search and recovery
UNESCO Convention on the Protection of the Underwater Cultural Heritage

References

Maritime archaeology